Dieter Krickow (born 8 July 1936) is a German modern pentathlete. He competed at the 1960 Summer Olympics for the United Team of Germany.

References

1936 births
Living people
German male modern pentathletes
Olympic modern pentathletes of the United Team of Germany
Modern pentathletes at the 1960 Summer Olympics
Sportspeople from Berlin